The Reno is a river of Emilia-Romagna, northern Italy. It is the tenth longest river in Italy (the sixth longest of those that flow directly into the sea) and the most important of the region apart from the Po.

Its upper course marks the border between Tuscany and Emilia-Romagna and flows in a wooded area crossed by the Bologna-Porretta-Pistoia railway line (inaugurated in 1864 and one of the most outstanding for the time as for engineering effort).
The upper course is characterized by several artificial reservoirs whose dams are used for hydro-electric energy production. The power produced in the basin of the Reno basin is second, for Apennine rivers, only to that of the Nera-Velino in Umbria.

It passes west of Bologna, at Casalecchio di Reno.
In its lower course the Reno receives the water of numerous streams, some of which are seasonal. The most important include the Limentra orientale, Silla, Setta, Samoggia, Idice, Sillaro, Santerno and Senio.

The Reno was a tributary of the Po until the middle of the 18th century when the course was diverted to lessen the risk of devastating floods. It now joins the Adriatic Sea near Casalborsetti, south-east of the Valli di Comacchio.

The name of the river has the same etymology as the name of the Rhine, as both derive from the same Celtic hydronym
Rēnos, the Reno basin being situated within Gallia Cisalpina, in what was the territory of Boii before the Roman conquest of 220 BC. In Italian both rivers are called Reno, and in Latin both were called Rhenus. 
In 43 BC the pact establishing the Second triumvirate was signed on an islet of the river near  Bononia (Bologna).
The river is mentioned by Dante Alighieri in Canto XVIII of his Inferno where he defines the Bolognesi as those "living between the Savena and the Reno".

Footnotes

External links
Historical and geographical info 

 
Rivers of Italy
Rivers of the Province of Ferrara
Rivers of the Province of Pistoia
Rivers of the Province of Bologna
Rivers of the Apennines